The canton of Livry-Gargan is an administrative division of the Seine-Saint-Denis department, Île-de-France region, northern France. Its borders were modified at the French canton reorganisation which came into effect in March 2015. Its seat is in Livry-Gargan.

It consists of the following communes:
Clichy-sous-Bois
Livry-Gargan

References

Cantons of Seine-Saint-Denis